Mohammed Al-Hammadi (born 11 May 1997) is an Emirati footballer. He currently plays as a forward  for Baniyas .

External links

References

Emirati footballers
1997 births
Living people
Al Wahda FC players
Baniyas Club players
UAE Pro League players
Association football forwards